Kheyrabad-e Humeh may refer to:
 Kheyrabad-e Humeh, Fars
 Kheyrabad-e Humeh, Kerman